36 Capricorni is a single, yellow-hued star in the southern constellation of Capricornus. It is visible to the naked eye with an apparent visual magnitude of +4.50. It is currently moving closer with a heliocentric radial velocity of −21 km/s, and will come within  in about 685,000 years ago.

This is an evolved G-type giant star with a stellar classification of G7IIIb Fe–1, where the suffix notation indicates an underabundance of iron found in the spectrum. At the age of 2.4 billion years it has become a red clump giant, meaning it is generating energy through helium fusion at its core. It has an estimated 1.94 times the mass of the Sun and is radiating 44.7 times the Sun's luminosity from its photosphere at an effective temperature of 5,017 K.

Chinese Name
Consequently, 36 Capricorni itself is represent the state Jin(or Tsin), together with κ Herculis in Right Wall of Heavenly Market Enclosure (asterism)

References

G-type giants
Horizontal-branch stars
Capricornus (constellation)
Capricorni, b
Durchmusterung objects
Capricorni, 36
204381
106039
8213